The 3 arrondissements of the Vaucluse department are:
 Arrondissement of Apt, (subprefecture: Apt) with 57 communes.  The population of the arrondissement was 128,793 in 2016.  
 Arrondissement of Avignon, (prefecture of the Vaucluse department: Avignon) with 17 communes.  The population of the arrondissement was 214,340 in 2016.  
 Arrondissement of Carpentras, (subprefecture: Carpentras) with 77 communes.  The population of the arrondissement was 215,881 in 2016.

History

In 1800 the arrondissements of Avignon, Apt, Carpentras and Orange were established. The arrondissement of Orange was abolished in 1926. Cavaillon replaced Apt as subprefecture in 1926, which was reverted in 1933. 

The borders of the arrondissements of Vaucluse were modified in January 2017:
 one commune from the arrondissement of Apt to the arrondissement of Avignon
 two communes from the arrondissement of Avignon to the arrondissement of Apt
 21 communes from the arrondissement of Avignon to the arrondissement of Carpentras
 two communes from the arrondissement of Carpentras to the arrondissement of Avignon

References

Vaucluse